Conor McManus (born 1987) is a Gaelic footballer who plays at senior level for the Monaghan county team. Often referred to as his county's best ever player, he is Monaghan's top scorer in National Football League history.

After winning the 2013 Ulster Senior Football Championship with Monaghan, he was hauled down by Sean Cavanagh in sight of goal in the All-Ireland quarter-final, with Monaghan losing only by two points in the end. McManus was later named in the 23-man Ireland squad for the 2013 International Rules Series against Australia. He scored two goals in the second Test at Croke Park and won the man of the match award, as Ireland romped to a record-breaking victory. On 8 November 2013, McManus won an All Star at corner-forward. He added a second All Star in 2015 after winning his second Ulster Championship that year, having scored 1-26 in just four matches. During a club match with Clontibret O'Neills in Spring 2014, he suffered a knee injury that kept him out until the Ulster Football Championship Quarter Final against Tyrone. He won another County Championship medal as Clontibret came back from a 5-point deficit to win 1-10 to 1-09 against favourited Scotstown. McManus enjoyed what many believe to have been his finest hour in the 2015 Ulster Final when, despite being marked tightly by the Donegal defence, he managed to score six points in an 0-11 to 0-10 win for the Farney Men. McManus also scored 0-12 in a 1-14 to 0-16 loss to All-Ireland champions Dublin in the National League Division 1 on 27 February 2016 in what was regarded by many pundits as one of the greatest individual performances seen in Croke Park in a long time. He was the top scorer in that year's National League, scoring an impressive 2-43. As of 30/7/17, McManus has scored 2-27 in this year's All-Ireland Championship, including 0-10 against Down in the Qualifier Round 4B tie at headquarters.

Selected for Ireland in the 2014 International Rules Test, McManus won the GAA Medal as the Irish player of the series in a team which was defeated by 10 points against Australia. He was a key scoring asset for Ireland in the 2015 test match, which Ireland won, before winning a second GAA Medal in the 2017 International Rules Series, for his performance in a losing Irish side.

Career statistics
As of 27 July 2018

Honours
 Ulster Senior Football Championship (2): 2013, 2015
 National Football League, Division 2 (1): 2014
 National Football League, Division 3 (1): 2013
 International Rules Series (4): 2013, 2014, 2015 (GAA Medal), 2017 (GAA Medal)
 All Star (3): 2013, 2015, 2018

References

1987 births
Living people
Gaelic football forwards
Irish international rules football players
Monaghan inter-county Gaelic footballers